Hans Roland (born 1931) is an Australian author and teacher.

Born in Hamburg, Germany, in 1931, he grew up at the time of the rise of the Nazi Party.  Whilst Roland joined the Hitler Youth his family joined an underground movement to assist Jews to leave Germany.  Later his Hitler Youth group fought against the invading Russians.  He wrote about his experiences in A Family Under the Jackboot.  In 1952 he emigrated to Australia, where he taught woodworking at the Royal Victorian Institute for the Blind.

Bibliography
 A Family under the Jackboot, Hans Roland, Pascoe Publishing, 1993, 

1931 births
Australian non-fiction writers
Living people
Hitler Youth members
German Army personnel of World War II
Child soldiers in World War II